KDEC (1240 kHz) is a commercial AM radio station broadcasting in Decorah, Iowa. KDEC airs an adult contemporary format branded as "The River".

KDEC broadcasts on a frequency shared with local non-commercial college radio station KWLC.

History
In 1926, Decorah's first radio station started broadcasting from the south end of the second floor of the Ben Bear building, with Charles Greenley the announcer. Charles Greenley had been an employee of Ben Bear in various capacities. He was put in charge of the new radio station, known by the call letters KCGA. In December 1926, Luther College founded its own station known as KWLC.

On September 30, 2019, KDEC changed their format from oldies to a simulcast of adult contemporary-formatted KMRV 1160 AM Waukon.

On May 8, 2021, KDHK started broadcasting in HD with The River on HD2.

References

External links
FCC timeshare documentation

DEC
Radio stations established in 1947
1947 establishments in Iowa